The World Archery Championships are a series of competitions in Archery organised by the World Archery Federation (WA). The first competition held under that title took place in 1931.

Competition archery takes a wide variety of formats, but the title World Championships is commonly reserved for the following three events:

 Outdoor World Championships in target Archery
 Indoor World Championships in target Archery
 World Championships in field Archery.

Of these, the Outdoor World Championships in target Archery is most commonly referred to as simply the 'World Archery Championships', and the winners most commonly referred to as simply "world champions". Events in those outdoor championships are held involving fixed targets at set distances, using a variety of bows, the recurve bow from 1931 and the compound bow since 1995.

Although less widely recognised, World Championship events are also held in Youth archery (outdoor only - field and indoor youth events are held alongside the senior championships), Para-archery, University archery and 3D archery. A ski archery World Championships was last held in 2007, but is not part of the current rotation. Following the accession of archery to permanent sports at the Summer Universiade, the university world championships will also cease to be part of the World Archery Championships rotation in 2014.

World Archery Championships Events 

And for the divisions as defined in their respective chapters:

 World Archery Flight Championships;
 World Archery Ski Championships;
 World Archery Run Championships.

Despite the above provision, a World Championship does not have to be awarded if the executive board determines it is not appropriate.

Outdoor

Indoor

Field

3D

Ski Archery 
The eighth Ski Archery World Championships held in Moscow in Russia in 2013.

Para 

 https://www.ianseo.net/Details.php?toId=818 - 2015
 http://ianseo.net/Details.php?toId=2040 - 2017

Youth

University

See also 
 Asian Archery Championships
 African Archery Championships
 European Archery Championships
 World Outdoor Archery Championships
 World Indoor Archery Championships
 World Field Archery Championships
 World 3D Archery Championships
 World Ski Archery Championships
 World Para Archery Championship
 World Youth Archery Championships
 World University Archery Championships

References

External links 
 World Archery Federation
 World Archery Indoor Championship